Zhu Hongzhang (1820? – 1895), born in Liping, Guizhou, was an eminent Han Chinese official and a military general of the late Qing Dynasty in China. He joined the Xiang Army to fight against the Taiping Rebellion and to restore the stability of the Qing state. He was one of the nine generals that lead a force of 60,000 troops to occupied Nanjing in 1864. Zhu was awarded a third-class merit for the recovery Nanjing. Although Zhu was awarded a third-class merit for the recovery Nanjing after Commander Zeng Guoquan commended Zhu's work to the Beijing government, there were dissenting opinions that Zhu should have received the first merit instead of Li Chendian.

The First-Wave Offensive
During the Battle of Nanjing (1864), on 19 July the attackers detonated explosives in a tunnel under Taiping Gate, bringing somewhere between 2 and 10 km of the wall down. Zhu led 1800 soldiers through the breach, into the city, but 460 were killed by the bombs of the weakened Taiping defenders. Zhu's troops took Taiping on the following day. This won Zhu the Imperial yellow jacket merit.

References

Porter, Jonathan. Tseng Kuo-Fan's Private Bureaucracy. Berkeley: University of California, 1972.
Wright, Mary Clabaugh. The Last Stand of Chinese Conservatism: The T'ung-Chih Restoration, 1862 -1874. Stanford, CA: Stanford University Press, 1957.
Third Battle of Nanking

External links
 Tang Haoming's Three-Book Trilogy of Zeng Guofan's life 《曾国荃》 

1820 births
1895 deaths
People from Qiandongnan
Qing dynasty generals
Year of birth uncertain
Generals from Guizhou
Military leaders of the Taiping Rebellion